Right-wing terrorism, hard right terrorism, extreme right terrorism or far-right terrorism is terrorism that is motivated by a variety of different right-wing and far-right ideologies, most prominently, it is motivated by neo-Nazism, anti-communism, neo-fascism, ecofascism, ethnonationalism, religious nationalism, and anti-government patriot/sovereign citizen beliefs, and occasionally, it is motivated by opposition to abortion, tax resistance, and homophobia. Modern right-wing terrorism largely emerged in Western Europe in the 1970s, and after the Revolutions of 1989 and the dissolution of the Soviet Union in 1991, it emerged in Eastern Europe and Russia.

Right-wing terrorists aim to overthrow governments and replace them with nationalist and/or fascist regimes. They believe that their actions will trigger events that will ultimately lead to the establishment of these authoritarian governments. Although they frequently take inspiration from Fascist Italy, Nazi Germany, and Imperial Japan with some exceptions, right-wing terrorist groups frequently lack a rigid ideology. Right-wing terrorists tend to target people who they consider members of foreign communities, but they may also target political opponents, such as left-wing groups and individuals. The attacks which are perpetrated by right-wing terrorists are not indiscriminate attacks which are perpetrated by individuals and groups which simply seek to kill people; the targets of these attacks are carefully chosen. Because the targets of these attacks are often entire sections of communities, they are not targeted as individuals, instead, they are targeted because they are representatives of groups which are considered foreign, inferior and threatening by them.

Causes

Economy 
German economist Armin Falk et al. wrote in a 2011 article that Right-Wing Extremist Crime (REC), which includes anti-foreigner and racist motivations, is associated with unemployment rates; as unemployment rates increase, REC also increases. A 2014 paper argues that right-wing terrorism increases with economic growth, seemingly due to its proponents often being people who lose out under economic modernisation. Conversely, a 2019 study found that economic predictors did not predict right-wing terrorism in Europe, rather, levels of extra-European immigration did; right-wing terrorists did not want immigrants in their countries and they sought to drive them out with force. Thus, increased migration caused greater resentment and thus, their greater resentment was a greater motive for their attacks.

Right-wing populist politics 
In 2016, Thomas Greven suggested that right-wing populism is a cause of right-wing terrorism. More simply put, populism supports the advancement of "the average citizen", not the agendas of the privileged elite. Greven defines right-wing populists as those who support ethnocentrism, and oppose immigration. Because right-wing populism creates a climate of "us versus them", terrorism is more likely to occur. Vocal opposition to Islamic terrorism by Donald Trump has been obscuring right-wing terrorism in the US, where right-wing terror attacks outnumber Islamist and left-wing attacks combined.

In the wake of the Christchurch mosque shootings at the Al Noor Mosque and Linwood Islamic Centre in Christchurch, New Zealand, by terrorist Brenton Harrison Tarrant, expert in terrorism Greg Barton, of Deakin University in Australia (the home country of Tarrant), wrote of the "toxic political environment that allows hate to flourish". Saying that although right-wing extremism in Australia is not nearly as serious as the European neo-Nazi movements or the various types of white supremacy and toxic nationalism seen in American politics, both major parties attempted to win votes by repeating some of the tough language and inhumane policies which appeared to reward right-wing populists. He further argued: "The result has been such a cacophony of hateful rhetoric that it has been hard for those tasked with spotting the emergence of violent extremism to separate it from all the background noise of extremism".

Fringe groups 

According to Moghadam and Eubank (2006), groups which are associated with right-wing terrorism include white power skinhead gangs, far-right hooligans, and their sympathizers. The "intellectual guides" of right-wing terrorist movements espouse the view that the state must "rid itself of the foreign elements that undermine it from within" so the state can "provide for its rightful, natural citizens."

In Australia, experts, police and others have been commenting on the failure of the authorities to act effectively in order to combat right-wing radicalisation, and the government has vowed to put right-wing extremist individuals and groups under greater scrutiny and pressure, with the home affairs secretary Mike Pezzullo making strong comments to a parliamentary committee. A week after the Christchurch mosque shootings in Christchurch, New Zealand, it emerged that three years earlier, Australian-born Brenton Harrison Tarrant, the perpetrator of the shootings, had been active on the Facebook pages of two Australian-based white nationalist groups, the United Patriots Front (UPF) and True Blue Crew (TBC) and praised the UPF's leader neo-Nazi Blair Cotrrell as they all celebrated Donald Trump's victory in the 2016 presidential election in the United States. Tarrant was also offered but declined a membership in the Lads Society, a white nationalist fight club which was founded by Cottrell.

In the United States, Brian Levin, director of the Center for the Study of Hate & Extremism at California State University, San Bernardino and former NYPD officer, wrote of the growth of white nationalism by saying that the political climate of polarization "has provided an opportunity for violent bigots, both on- and offline. Times of change, fear and conflict offer extremists and conspiracists a chance to present themselves as an alternative to increasingly distrusted traditional mainstream choices." He quotes former FBI agent Erroll Southers' view that white supremacy "is being globalized at a very rapid pace", and he urged the government to hold hearings to investigate homegrown extremism. Sociologists at the University of Dayton pointed to the origin of white nationalism in the US and its spread to other countries, and they also noted that the Christchurch attacker's hatred of Muslims was inspired by American white nationalism.

The Anti-Defamation League reports that white supremacist propaganda and recruitment efforts both on and around college campuses have been increasing sharply, with 1,187 incidents in 2018 compared to 421 incidents in 2017, far exceeding any previous year. Far-right terrorists rely on a variety of strategies such as leafleting, the performance of violent rituals, and house parties in order to recruit, mostly targeting angry and marginalized youth who are looking for solutions to their problems. But their most effective recruitment tool is extremist music, which avoids monitoring by moderating parties such as parents and school authorities. Some risk factors which are facilitating recruitment include exposure to racism during childhood, dysfunctional families such as divorced parents, physical, emotional, and sexual abuse, neglect, and disillusionment.

Copycat terrorism
In the cases of far-right extremists, they will sometimes seek inspiration from other mass murderers and use it as a template to carry out future terrorist attacks. A notable case of this is Brenton Harrison Tarrant, the Australian-born perpetrator of the Christchurch mosque shootings that killed 51 and injured 49; he cited several earlier far-right attackers, including Anders Behring Breivik, who carried out the 2011 Norway attacks; and Dylann Roof, who killed nine black people in the Charleston church shooting.

John T. Earnest, the perpetrator of an arson attack on a mosque in Escondido, California, and a mass shooting in a synagogue in nearby Poway, wrote an open letter in which he stated that he was inspired by Tarrant and Robert Bowers, the perpetrator of the Pittsburgh synagogue shooting. Following the Escondido arson attack, he had left graffiti that read "For Brenton Tarrant, -t /pol/", and prior to the synagogue shooting, he published the said open letter on 8chan and attempted to livestream the attack on Facebook Live, just like Tarrant. In the open letter, Earnest also mentioned "The Day of the Rope", a talking point in white nationalist and neo-Nazi circles which refers to the execution of all non-whites, Jews, and liberals, as it is detailed in the 1978 novel The Turner Diaries.

Patrick Crusius, the 21-year-old suspect in the mass shooting at a Walmart store in El Paso, Texas, on August 3, 2019, which killed 23 people and injured 23 others (almost all of whom were Hispanic Americans and Mexicans), wrote an online manifesto titled The Inconvenient Truth, and in it, he stated that he supported Tarrant and his manifesto. Just like Tarrant, Crusius posted his manifesto on 8chan, as well as a Collin College notification letter.

Role of the media

Social media 
Social media platforms have been one of the principal means by which right-wing extremist ideas and hate speech have been shared and promulgated, leading to extensive debate about the limits of free speech and its impact on terrorist action and hate crimes. In 2018, researchers in the US identified the YouTube recommendation system as promoting a range of political positions from mainstream libertarianism and conservatism to overt white nationalism. Many other online discussion groups and forums are used for online right-wing radicalization. Robert Bowers the perpetrator of the Pittsburgh synagogue shooting at Tree of Life - Or L'Simcha Congregation in Pittsburgh, Pennsylvania, was a regular verified user on Gab, a "free speech" alternative to Twitter, and spread antisemitic, neo-Nazi, and Holocaust denial propaganda as well as interacted with and/or reposted at least five alt-right figures: Brad "Hunter Wallace" Griffin of Occidental Dissent and League of the South (LS), Daniel "Jack Corbin" McMahon, a self-described "Antifa Hunter" and "fascist", former California Republican Patrick Little, Jared Wyand of Project Purge and Daniel "Grandpa Lampshade" Kenneth Jeffreys of The Daily Stormer and Radio Aryan. Twitter was found to be offering advertisements targeted to 168,000 users in a white genocide conspiracy theory category, which they removed shortly after being contacted by journalists in the wake of the Pittsburgh synagogue shooting. After a Brooklyn synagogue was vandalized with death threats, the term "Kill all Jews" was listed as a trending topic on Twitter.

Australian-born terrorist Brenton Harrison Tarrant the perpetrator of the Christchurch mosque shootings at Al Noor Mosque and Linwood Islamic Centre in Christchurch, New Zealand, recorded a video of the attacks on Facebook Live which was shared extensively on social media as well as spreading his manifesto The Great Replacement on his Facebook and Twitter accounts and on 8chan /pol/ where he would announce the attacks and prior to this his social media was filled with white nationalist, anti-Islamic and neo-fascist material and his profile picture was "The Australian Shitposter" an image of a tanned, blonde-haired Akubra hat wearing man from Australia used to represent users on 4chan and 8chan as well as the alt-right subculture "The Dingoes". The government of New Zealand already had laws in place relating to terrorism under which people sharing the video can be prosecuted, and it was announced that this would be vigorously pursued. Prime Minister Jacinda Ardern also vowed to investigate the role played by social media in the attack and take action, possibly alongside other countries, against the sites that broadcast the video.

Facebook and Twitter became more active in banning extremists from their platform in the wake of the tragedy. Facebook pages associated with Future Now Australia had been removed from the platform, including their main page, Stop the Mosques and Save Australia. Far-right activist leaders in Australia urged their supporters to follow them on Gab after being banned from Twitter and Facebook. On March 28, 2019, Facebook announced that they have banned white nationalist and white separatist content along with white supremacy. Patrick Crusius the man responsible for the 2019 El Paso shooting which killed 23 people and injured 23 others had prior to the incident liked/posted/retweeted content on his Twitter account in support of Donald Trump.

Mass media 
Owen Jones wrote in The Guardian about how the press in Britain can play a role in helping to radicalise far-right terrorists, quoting Neil Basu, Britain's counter-terrorism chief. Basu cited the Daily Mail and Daily Mirror as particular culprits, while Jones also give examples from The Times, The Telegraph, The Spectator and others, with articles bemoaning so-called Cultural Marxism and misleading headlines such as "1 in 5 Brit Muslims" having sympathy with jihadists (The Sun).

Africa

South Africa 
In 1993, Chris Hani, the General Secretary of the South African Communist Party was murdered by Polish-born far-right anti-Communist Janusz Waluś who had been lent a firearm by far-right pro-Apartheid MP Clive Derby-Lewis.

The Afrikaner Weerstandsbeweging, a neo-Nazi paramilitary organisation, has often been described as terrorist.

In 2010, South African authorities foiled a plot by far-right terrorists to commit attacks as revenge for the murder of Eugène Terre'Blanche, seizing explosives and firearms.

International organisations
Atomwaffen Division is an accelerationist neo-Nazi terror organization found in 2013 by Brandon Russell responsible for multiple murders and mass casualty plots. Atomwaffen has been proscribed as a terror organization in United Kingdom, Canada and Australia.
The Base is a neo-Nazi, white supremacist and accelerationist paramilitary hate group and training network, formed in 2018 by Rinaldo Nazzaro and active in the United States, Canada, Australia, South Africa, and Europe.  it is considered a terrorist organization in Canada, Australia and the United Kingdom.
Combat 18 is a neo-Nazi organization that has been proscribed in Canada and Germany and is tied to the assassination of Walter Lübcke and the 2009 Vítkov arson attack.
Nordic Resistance Movement is a pan-Nordic neo-Nazi organization that adheres to accelerationism and is tied to ONA and multiple terror plots and murders, like the murder of an antifascist in Helsinki in 2016. There has been an international effort to proscribe NRM as a terrorist organization, and it was banned as such in Finland in 2019.
Order of the Nine Angles is a neo-Nazi satanist organization that has been connected to multiple murders and terror plots. There has been an international effort to proscribe ONA as a terror organization. Further, the ONA is connected to the Atomwaffen and the Base and the founder of ONA David Myatt was one-time leader of the C18.
Russian Imperial Movement is a white supremacist accelerationist organization found in Russia and proscribed as a terror organization in United States and Canada for its connection to neo-fascist terrorists. People trained by RIM have gone on to commit a series of bombings and joined the separatist militants in Donbass. While based in Russia, RIM trains and maintains contacts with neo-Nazis internationally, including with Atomwaffen.

Americas

Argentina 
The Argentine Patriotic League (Liga Patriótica Argentina) was a Nacionalista paramilitary group, founded in Buenos Aires on January 16, 1919, during the Tragic week. It was merged into the Argentine Civic Legion in 1931.

The Argentine Anticommunist Alliance (usually known as the Triple A or the AAA) was a far-right death squad which was founded in Argentina in 1973 and was active during Isabel Perón's rule (1974–1976).

Brazil 
During the rule of Brazil's military regime, some right-wing military organizations engaged in violent repression. The Riocentro 1981 May Day Attack was a bombing attempt that happened on the night of April 30, 1981. Severe casualties were suffered by the terrorists. While an NGO held a fundraiser fighting for democracy and free elections and celebrating the upcoming holiday, a bomb exploded at Riocentro parking area killing army sergeant Guilherme Pereira do Rosário and severely wounding captain Wilson Dias Machado, who survived the bomb explosion. The bomb exploded inside a car where both were preparing it. Rosário died instantaneously. They were the only casualties.

The Para-SAR example was revealed by Brazilian Air Force captain Sérgio Ribeiro Miranda de Carvalho in 1968 before it reached the execution phase as it was made public to the press after a meeting with his superior Brigadier General João Paulo Burnier and chief of Para-SAR unity. Burnier discussed a secret plan to bomb a dense traffic area of Rio de Janeiro known as "Gasômetro" during commute and later claim that Communists were the perpetrators. He expected to be able to run a witch-hunt against the growing political military opposition. Burnier also mentioned his intentions on making the Para-SAR, a Brazilian Air Force rescue unity, a tool for eliminating some military regime political oppositors throwing them to the sea at a wide distance of the coast. On both of these events, no military involved on these actions or planning was arrested, charged or faced retaliation from the Brazilian military dictatorship. The only exception is captain Sérgio de Carvalho which had to leave the air force for facing his superiors retaliation after whistleblowing brigadier Burnier's plan.

Colombia 
Colombian paramilitary groups were responsible for most of the human rights violations in the latter half of the ongoing Colombian conflict. According to several international human rights and governmental organizations, right-wing paramilitary groups were responsible for at least 70 to 80% of political murders in Colombia per year during the 1980s and 1990s. The first paramilitary groups were organized by the Colombian government following recommendations made by U.S. military counterinsurgency advisers who were sent to Colombia in the early 1960s, during the Cold War, to combat leftist political activists and armed guerrilla groups.

These groups were financed and protected by elite landowners, drug traffickers, members of the security forces, right-wing politicians and multinational corporations. Paramilitary violence and terrorism has principally been targeted towards peasants, unionists, indigenous people, human rights workers, teachers and left-wing political activists or their supporters.

Nicaragua 
The Contras were a right-wing militant group, backed by the United States, that fought against the Sandinista National Liberation Front in Nicaragua. They were responsible for numerous human rights violations and carried out over 1300 terrorist attacks.

United States

Reconstruction era 
Scholars label acts of terrorism which were committed against African Americans during the Reconstruction era "white terrorism".

Pre-2001 
According to American political scientist George Michael, "right-wing terrorism and violence has a long history in America". In the aftermath of the Brown v. Board of Education decision (1954), members of a resurgent Ku Klux Klan waged a campaign of terrorism against blacks, civil rights activists, Jews, and others. Klansmen bombed the 16th Street Baptist Church in Birmingham, Alabama, in 1963, killing four African American girls and injuring 14–22 others, and they also committed other murders, including those of James Chaney, Andrew Goodman, and Michael Schwerner (1963), Lemuel Penn (1964), Viola Liuzzo (1965), and Michael Donald. Between 1956 and 1963, an estimated 130 bombings were perpetrated in the South.

During the 1980s, more than 75 right-wing extremists were prosecuted for acts of terrorism in the United States, they carried out six attacks. In 1983, Gordon Kahl, a Posse Comitatus activist, killed two federal marshals and he was later killed by police. Also that year, the white nationalist revolutionary group The Order (also known as the Brüder Schweigen or the Silent Brotherhood) robbed banks and armored cars, as well as a sex shop, bombed a theater and a synagogue and murdered radio talk show host Alan Berg.

The 19 April 1995 attack on the Murrah federal building in Oklahoma by Timothy McVeigh and Terry Nichols killed 168 people and it was the deadliest act of domestic terrorism in the history of the United States. McVeigh stated that it was committed in retaliation for the government's actions at Ruby Ridge and Waco.

Eric Rudolph executed a series of terrorist attacks between 1996 and 1998. He carried out the 1996 Centennial Olympic Park bombing – which claimed two lives and injured 111 – aiming to cancel the games, claiming they promoted global socialism and to embarrass the U.S. government. Rudolph confessed to bombing an abortion clinic in Sandy Springs, an Atlanta suburb, on January 16, 1997, the Otherside Lounge, an Atlanta lesbian bar, on February 21, 1997, injuring five and an abortion clinic in Birmingham, Alabama on January 29, 1998, killing Birmingham police officer and part-time clinic security guard Robert Sanderson and critically injuring nurse Emily Lyons. He was linked an extreme right-wing group.

The Jewish Defense League is a Jewish religious-political organization in the United States, its stated goal is to "protect Jews from antisemitism by whatever means necessary". The FBI has classified it as "a right wing terrorist group" since 2001, and it has been designated as a hate group by the Southern Poverty Law Center. According to the FBI, the JDL has been involved in plotting and executing acts of terrorism within the United States. As of 2015, most terrorism watch groups classified the group as inactive.

Post-2001 
According to a report which was published by the Center for Strategic and International Studies, as of 2020, right-wing terrorism accounted for the majority of terrorist attacks and plots in the United States. As of May 2022, the New America Foundation placed the number killed in terrorist attacks in the United States since 9/11 as follows: 122 killed in far-right attacks, 107 killed in jihadist attacks, 17 killed in "ideological misogyny/incel" attacks, 12 killed in black separatist/nationalist/supremacist attacks, and 1 killed in a far-left attack.

According to a 2017 Government Accountability Office report, 73% of violent extremist incidents that resulted in deaths since September 12, 2001, were caused by right-wing extremist groups, while radical Islamist extremists were responsible for 27%. The total number of deaths which were caused by each group was about the same, but 41% of the deaths which were attributable to radical Islamists occurred in a single event – the 2016 Orlando nightclub shooting in which 49 people were killed by a lone gunman. No deaths were attributed to left-wing terrorist groups.

In October 2020, the Department of Homeland Security reported that white supremacists posed the top domestic terrorism threat, which FBI director Christopher Wray confirmed in March 2021, noting that the bureau had elevated the threat to the same level as the threat which was posed by ISIS.</ref>

A 2019 report stated that 50 people in the United States were killed in murders which were committed by domestic extremists (the murders included ideologically and non-ideologically motivated homicides) during the previous year. Of these killings, 78% of them were perpetrated by white supremacists, 16% of them were perpetrated by anti-government extremists, 4% of them were perpetrated by "incel" extremists, and 2% of them were perpetrated by domestic Islamist extremists. Over the broader 2009 to 2018 time period, a total of 313 people were killed by right-wing extremists in the United States (the crimes included ideologically and non-ideologically motivated homicides), of those homicides, 76% of them were committed by white supremacists, 19% of them were committed by anti-government extremists (including those extremists who were affiliated with the militia, "sovereign citizen", tax protester, and "Patriot" movements), 3% of them were committed by "incel" extremists, 1% of them were committed by anti-abortion extremists, and 1% of them were committed by other right-wing extremists.

As of 2021, America's new tally of victims of terrorism shows that since the September 11 attacks in 2001, 122 people have been killed in right-wing extremist attacks. The incidents which caused deaths were the following:

A report in The Washington Post, published on November 25, 2018, showed violent right-wing-related incidents up, and left-wing-related incidents down. Total domestic terrorism incidents was down to 41 in 2001, from a high of 468 in 1970, but then went up to 65 in 2017. Of those 65 events in 2017, 36 were right-wing-related (with 11 fatalities), 10 were left-wing-related (with 6 fatalities), 7 were related to Islamist extremism (with 16 fatalities), and 12, including the 2017 Las Vegas shooting, were categorized as "Other/Unknown" (with 62 fatalities, including 58 from the Las Vegas incident at the time). The report found that 2018 was a particularly deadly year, with 11 people dying in the Pittsburgh synagogue shooting, 2 others in an incident in Kentucky, and two more in a shooting in Tallahassee. All three incidents were right-wing related.

The Post reported that the upsurge in right-wing violence began during the Barack Obama administration and picked up steam under the presidency of Donald Trump, whose remarks after the Unite the Right rally in Charlottesville, Virginia, in 2017 that there were "some very fine people on both sides" is widely seen as giving confidence to the right that the administration looked favorably on their goals, providing them with "tacit support". A former FBI assistant director for counterintelligence, is quoted as saying that "[political leaders] from the White House down, used to serve as a check on conduct and speech that was abhorrent to most people. I see that eroding. ... The current political rhetoric is at least enabling, and certainly not discouraging, violence."

According to analysis by the newspaper of data from the Global Terrorism Database, 92 of 263 domestic terrorism events – 35% – that occurred from 2010 to 2017 were right-wing related, while 38 (14%) were Islamist extremist-related, and 34 (13%) were left-wing related. Not only that, but a criminologist from John Jay College stated that right-wing attacks were statistically more likely to result in fatalities.

 On January 6, 2021, a mob of rioters supporting President Trump's attempts to overturn the 2020 United States presidential election, stormed the U.S. Capitol during speeches made by Trump and his allies at a rally. After breaching multiple police perimeters, they damaged and occupied parts of the building for several hours. National Guard units from several states were called up to deal with the violence, while the riots resulted in six deaths (four rioters and two police officers), over 80 arrests, and 116 officers being injured. Several high-profile members of the government and Capitol security resigned, including the chief of the Capitol Police, the Sergeant-at-Arms of both the House of Representatives and the Senate. Over 70 other countries and international organizations expressed their concerns over the protests and condemned the violence. One group involved, the Proud Boys, was designated a terrorist organisation in Canada. Since then, at least two dozen Proud Boys members and affiliates have been indicted for their alleged roles in the insurrection. 

During congressional testimony two months after the Capitol assault, FBI director Christopher Wray characterized the incident as "domestic terrorism". Although he did not attribute the assault to a specific group, he made clear that the evidence showed a connection to right-wing extremism, particularly militia groups. When asked if "right-wing white supremacist groups played an instrumental role," Wray explained that the FBI did not use labels about political positioning, but agreed "we're basically saying the same thing." Wray testified that the top threat of domestic violent extremists were "specifically those who advocate for the superiority of the white race," alongside the threat posed by ISIL.  Despite efforts by many conservatives, including during the congressional hearing, to blame antifa for the attack, Wray reiterated that the FBI had found no evidence to support the allegations. A February 2021 poll found that found that 58% of Republicans believe the Capitol riot was "mostly an antifa-inspired attack that only involved a few Trump supporters."

Europe

Belgium
Westland New Post was an underground neo-Nazi terror group in the 1980s. They are suspected to be linked to the Brabant killings over four years killing 28 people.

Croatia 

According to Prime Minister of Croatia at the time, Andrej Plenković, 2020 Zagreb shooting was motivated by the ruling party Croatian Democratic Union (HDZ)'s coalition with the largest Serb party in the country, Independent Democratic Serb Party (SDSS).

Denmark 
Neo-Nazis were suspected to have perpetrated the 1992 Copenhagen bombing, in which the office of a left-wing socialist party was attacked, killing one of its members.

Finland 

Arguably the first modern act of right-wing terrorism is the assassination of general-governor Nikolay Bobrikov by Finnish nationalist Eugen Schauman in 1904. However, this characterization is controversial in Finnish society where Schauman is widely idolized; Prime Minister Matti Vanhanen had to defend himself against backlash after describing the act as such.

Schauman's act inspired the nationalist movement and was quickly followed by the assassination of Eliel Soisalon-Soininen, the Chancellor of Justice by Lennart Hohenthal. Soisalon-Soininen was the highest ranking servant of the Tsar in Finland after the governor-general, and therefore an "arch-traitor" in the eyes of the nationalists. In 1904–1905, a secret Finnish nationalist society Verikoirat (the Bloodhounds) assassinated Russians, police officers and informants and bombed police stations. The group also planned assassinating the Tsar while he was vacationing in Primorsk but missed him. In 1905–1907, another secret society Karjalan Kansan Mahti (Might of the Karelians) were responsible for multiple murders of Russians and weapon thefts and bank robberies. 

10,000 leftists were killed by right-wing death squads during the white terror in 1918.

In 1919, the Aktivistien Keskus (Base of the Activists) group planned destroying St. Petersburg. Thirty-five Ingrian Finns were armed with handguns and explosives. The plan was to blow up the water works, the power plant and certain factories and set up fires all around the city that could not be put out. The operation was partially successful; the waterworks were destroyed and targets around the city were bombed and set on fire, but the bombing of the power plant failed and one man was captured. Dozens of people were killed and wounded.

In 1927, a group consisting of Finnish guides and White Russian emigres crossed into the USSR from Finland and bombed Soviet government offices with dozens of casualties. The Russians belonged to a group called the "White Idea" that aligned with the Russian Fascist Party.

In the 1920s–1940s, far-right and fascist groups attacked left-wing events and politicians systematically, resulting in deaths. The groups were responsible for bombing and burning down gathering places of the leftists. Minister of the Interior Heikki Ritavuori was assassinated for supposedly being too lenient towards communists. Conservative and White Guard authorities supported the far-right to a large extent, for instance the social democrat politician Onni Happonen was arrested by police who then turned him over to a fascist lynch mob to be killed.

In 1945, after the armistice with the Soviet Union, nationalist groups bombed multiple left-wing targets in Helsinki. Attacks in Haaga and Vallila against left-wing papers and meeting halls followed. A group identifying themselves as "fascists from Munkkiniemi" used dynamite and IEDs built from anti-aircraft shells to blow up the headquarters of Vapaa Sana newspaper.

During the Cold War, far-right activism was limited to small illegal groups like the clandestine Nazi occultist group led by Pekka Siitoin who made headlines after arson and bombing of the printing houses of the Communist Party of Finland. His associates also sent letter bombs to leftists, including to the headquarters of the Finnish Democratic Youth League. Another group called the "New Patriotic People's Movement" bombed the left-wing Kansan Uutiset newspaper and the embassy of communist Bulgaria. Member of the Nordic Realm Party Seppo Seluska was convicted of the torture and murder of a gay Jew.

In  neo-Nazis hijacked an airliner in Oulu Airport, demanding 60,000 marks for a neo-Nazi party they were affiliated with.

The skinhead culture gained momentum during the late 1980s and peaked during the late 1990s. In 1991, Finland received a number of Somali immigrants who became the main target of Finnish skinhead violence in the following years, including four attacks using explosives and a racist murder. Asylum seeker centres were attacked, in Joensuu skinheads would force their way into an asylum seeker centre and start shooting with shotguns. At worst Somalis were assaulted by 50 skinheads at the same time.

The most prominent neo-Nazi group Nordic Resistance Movement that is tied to multiple murders, attempted murders and assaults of political enemies was found in 2006 and proscribed in 2019. During the European migrant crisis 40 asylum seeker reception centres were targets of arson attacks. In its annual threat assessment for 2020, the National Bureau of Investigation found that despite of the ban, the threat of far-right terrorism had risen and identified 400 persons of interest "motivated and with the capacity to perform terrorism in Finland". International links and funding networks were pointed out as a special source of concern.

On 4 December 2021, the Finnish police arrested a five-man cell in Kankaanpää on suspicion of planning a terror attack and confiscated numerous firearms including assault rifles and tens of kilos of explosives. According to the Finnish media the men adhered to the ideology of Atomwaffen and James Mason and used Atomwaffen-like symbols.

In July 2022, a group of youth stole all the rainbow flags from a library in Lapua and left an improvised explosive device behind. There were no casualties but a gay pride event was interrupted by the explosion. On 26 August 2022 a bomb exploded near a pride in Savonlinna, the police has arrested two locals for the act.

France 

France has a modern history of right-wing terrorism that dates back to the middle of the 20th century. Historically, right-wing terrorism was tied to rage over the loss of France's colonial possessions in Africa, particularly Algeria. In 1961, the Organisation armée secrète or OAS, a right-wing terrorist group that protested Algerian independence from France, launched a bomb attack on board a Strasbourg–Paris train which killed 28 people.

On 14 December 1973, the far-right Charles Martel Group orchestrated a bomb attack at the Consulate of Algeria, killing 4 people and injuring 20. The group targeted mostly Algerian targets several more times.

In the town of Toulon, a far-right extremist group called SOS-France existed. On 18 August 1986, four members were driving a car carrying explosives, apparently in an attempt to bomb the offices of SOS Racisme. However it exploded while they were still in it, killing all four of them.

In more recent history, far-right extremism in France has been fueled by the rise of anti-immigrant far-right political movements. Neo-Nazi members of the French and European Nationalist Party were responsible for a pair of anti-immigrant terror bombings in 1988. Sonacotra hostels in Cagnes-sur-Mer and Cannes were bombed, killing Romanian immigrant George Iordachescu and injuring 16 people, mostly Tunisians. In an attempt to frame Jewish extremists for the Cagnes-sur-Mer bombing, the terrorists left leaflets bearing Stars of David and the name Masada at the scene, with the message "To destroy Israel, Islam has chosen the sword. For this choice, Islam will perish."

On 28 May 2008, members of the neo-Nazi Nomad 88 group fired with machine guns at people from their car in Saint-Michel-sur-Orge.

In the aftermath of the Charlie Hebdo shooting, six mosques and a restaurant were attacked in acts deemed as right-wing terrorism by authorities. The acts included grenade throwing, shooting, and use of an improvised explosive device.

Germany 

In 1980, a right-wing terrorist attack, known as Oktoberfest bombing in Munich, Germany, killed 13 people, including the attacker, and injured 215. Fears of an ongoing campaign of major right-wing terrorist attacks did not materialize.

In 1993, four neo-Nazi skinheads committed arson against the house of a Turkish German family in Solingen, Germany, resulting in the death of 5 female Turks and the injury of 14 others, including several children.

On 14 June 2000, the neo-Nazi Michael Berger killed three policemen in Dortmund and Waltrop.

In addition to several bank robberies, the Nationalsozialitscher Untergrund/National Socialist Underground (NSU) was responsible for the Bosphorus serial murders (2000–2006), the 2004 Cologne bombing and the murder of policewoman Michéle Kiesewetter in 2007 leaving at least 10 people dead and others injured. In November 2011, two members of the National Socialist Underground committed suicide after a bank robbery and a third member was arrested some days later.

Right-wing extremist offenses in Germany rose sharply in 2015 and 2016. Figures from the German government tallied 316 violent xenophobic offences in 2014 and 612 such offenses in 2015.

In August 2014, a group of four Germans founded a Munich-based far-right terrorist group, the Oldschool Society. The group, which held racist, antisemitic, and anti-Muslim views, eventually attracted 30 members. They stockpiled weapons and explosives and plotted to attack a refugee shelter in Saxony, but the group's leaders were arrested in May 2015 before carrying out the attack. In March 2017 four of the group's leaders were sentenced to prison terms.

The perpetrator of a mass shooting in Munich in 2016 had far-right views.

According to figures which were released by the interior ministry in May 2019, of an estimated 24,000 far-right extremists in the country, 12,700 Germans are inclined towards violence. Extremists belonging to Der Dritte Weg/The III. Path marched in through a town in Saxony on 1 May, the day before the Jewish remembrance of the Holocaust, carrying flags and a banner saying "Social justice instead of criminal foreigners".

Walter Lübcke, a Christian Democratic Union (CDU) politician from Hesse was assassinated at his home via gunshot because of his pro-migrant views by Stephan Ernst, a German Neo-Nazi who was a member of the British neo-Nazi terrorist group Combat 18 (C18) and the National Democratic Party of Germany (NPD) who had engaged in a series of anti-migrant crimes and had been convicted for knife and bomb attacks against minorities. Following the murder, the self-described "doomsday prepper" group Nordkreuz (German: Northern Cross) was discovered to have made kill lists of politicians and acquired body bags for a hypothetical "Day X" doomsday scenario; using the messaging app Telegram and a police database with 25,000 names, the group amassed firearms and ammunition.

On 9 October 2019, a mass shooting broke out near a synagogue and kebab stand in Halle, Saxony-Anhalt, Germany, resulting in two dead and two others injured. The perpetrator Stephan Balliet committed the attack out of antisemitic, antifeminist and racist beliefs which he live-streamed the attack on Twitch for 35 minutes.

On 19 February 2020, two mass shootings occurred at two shisha bars in Hanau, resulting in the death of nine people, all with an immigrant background. The attacker then killed his mother at their house and committed suicide. The 43-year-old attacker was identified as a far-right extremist, who expressed a hatred for immigrants.

In February 2020, following the observation of a meeting of a dozen right-wing extremists, those involved were arrested after they had decided to launch attacks on mosques in Germany to trigger a civil war.

Italy 

In the 1970s and 1980s, Italy endured the Years of Lead, a period characterized by frequent terrorist attacks: between 1969 and 1982, the nation suffered 8,800 terrorist attacks, in which a total of 351 people were killed and 768 were injured. The terrorist attacks have been both ascribed both to the far-left and the far-right, yet many of the terrorist attacks remain without a clear culprit; many have claimed that responsibility for the attacks could be ascribed to rogue members of the Italian secret service. Some of the terrorist attacks ascribed to a particular political group may have actually been the work of these rogue agents: this has been claimed, among many others, by Francesco Cossiga, who was the Prime Minister during the last years of lead, and by Giulio Andreotti, who, during the same period of time, held the office of Prime Minister more than once.

The Years of Lead are considered to have begun with the Piazza Fontana bombing in Milan in December 1969, perpetrated by Ordine Nuovo, a right-wing neofascist group. Sixteen people were killed, and 90 injured, in the bombing.

In July 1970, this same group carried out a bombing on a train traveling from Rome to Messina, killing six and wounding almost 100. The group also carried out the Piazza della Loggia bombing in 1974, killing eight antifascist activists. Perhaps the most infamous right-wing terrorist attack in post-war Italy is the August 1980 Bologna bombing, in which neo-fascist Nuclei Armati Rivoluzionari ("Armed Revolutionary Nuclei"), an Ordine Nuovo offshoot, killed 85 people and injured 200 at the Bologna railroad station. Valerio Fioravanti, Francesca Mambro, and two others were convicted of mass murder in the attacks, although both have always denied any connection with them.

In December 2011, Gianluca Casseri targeted Senegalese peddlers in Florence, killing two and injuring three others before killing himself. The perpetrator was a sympathizer of CasaPound, a neo-fascist party that Italian judges have recognized as not posing a threat to public or private safety.

In February 2018, neo-Nazi Lega Nord member Luca Traini shot and injured six African migrants in the town of Macerata.

Latvia 

On the night of 5 June 1997, members of the far-right Pērkonkrusts unsuccessfully bombed the Monument to the Liberators of Soviet Latvia and Riga from the German Fascist Invaders. Two of them were killed in the explosion, while six others, including Igors Šiškins, were sentenced for up to three years in prison in 2000. The group ceased organised activities or was banned around 2006.

In late 2018, the State Security Service arrested a self-proclaimed follower of the ideas of Anders Behring Breivik who was planning to perform terrorist attacks on an ethnic minority school and several commercial outlets in Jūrmala on 13 February, the birthday of Breivik. The individual had previously published comments on different websites for an extended period of time aimed against the Roma and Russian people, including calls to exterminate them. He was found guilty, but exempted from criminal liability on medical grounds and assigned to a psychiatric hospital for treatment.

Norway 
On 22 July 2011, Norwegian right-wing extremist with neo-Nazi and fascist sympathies Anders Behring Breivik carried out the 2011 Norway attacks, the deadliest attack in Norway since World War II. First he bombed several government buildings in Oslo, killing eight people and injuring more than 200. After the bombings, he went to Utøya island in a fake police uniform and began firing on people attending a political youth camp for the Worker's Youth League (AUF), a left-wing political party, killing 69 and injuring more than 110. Overall the two terrorist attacks in Utøya and Oslo, Norway resulted in 77 dead and 319 injured. Anders Behring Breivik also had written a manifesto 2083: A European Declaration of Independence in which he accused Islam, Cultural Marxism, multiculturalism, and feminism of causing a "cultural suicide" of Europe and claimed to belong to an organization called the Knights' Templar (named after the medieval military order).

Philip Manshaus was arrested for attacking Al-Noor Islamic Centre in Baerum, on the outskirts of Oslo, on August 10, 2019. According to police, the man appeared to hold "far-right" and "anti-immigrant" views and had expressed sympathy for Vidkun Quisling – the fascist World War II leader of Norway – as well as Australian-born terrorist Brenton Harrison Tarrant, the perpetrator of the Christchurch, New Zealand mosque shootings, John T. Earnest the perpetrator of the Escondido, California mosque fire and the Poway, California synagogue shooting, as well as Patrick Crusius the man behind the El Paso, Texas Walmart shooting targeting Mexicans. He has been charged with attempted murder in this case and with the murder of his 17-year-old stepsister in an unrelated incident. The mosque shooting is being investigated as a possible act of terrorism.

Poland 

Despite the country being nearly ethnically and religiously homogeneous, Polish far-right targets, via propaganda or physical violence, religious and ethnic minorities such as Jews, Romani people, people with darker complexion or Middle Eastern appearance. In 2016, police arrested a man who they say tried to burn down a mosque in Gdańsk. The man belonged to the neo-Nazi group called Blood & Honour.

Russia 
The Savior was a Russian neo-Nazi militant nationalist organization which claimed credit for the August 2006 Moscow market bombing, which killed 13. Media reports indicate that the market, located near Cherkizovsky, was targeted due to its high volume of Central Asian and Caucasian clientele. Four members of The Saviour were sentenced to life imprisonment, while four others received lesser prison terms. The Russian Imperial Movement is a Russian ultranationalist, white supremacist, far-right paramilitary organization based in Saint Petersburg. It has been designated as a terrorist group by the United States and Canada.

Russian separatist forces in Donbas include several right-wing militias, connected to the official armed forces of the right-wing breakaway Donetsk People's Republic and Luhansk People's Republic in eastern Ukraine, which are designed terrorist organisations by the Ukrainian government. International volunteers for the militias have been arrested for plotting terror attacks.

Spain 

Far-right terrorist acts surged after the death of dictator Francisco Franco in Spain 1975 and continued until the early 1980s, ranging from assassination of individuals to mass murder.

Sweden 

Both the 2009–10 Malmö shootings and the Trollhättan school attack were conducted by right-wing terrorists along with a refugee centre bombing in 2017. A notable serial killer motivated by far-right motives is John Ausonius. Far-rightists were also responsible for attacking an anti-racist demonstration in Stockholm in December 2013.

Slovakia

On October 12, 2022, two people were killed and another was injured after a right-wing terrorist opened fire against an LGBT venue in Bratislava.

Turkey

The neo-fascist ultranationalist Grey Wolves have been involved in terror attacks targeting both left-wing groups and ethnic minorities. The group is notable for its death squads during the political violence of the late 1970s, such as the Taksim Square massacre in 1977 (killings of leftists) or the Bahçelievler massacre in 1978 when seven students belonging to a socialist party were assassinated. The organization was responsible for Maraş and Çorum massacres where hundreds of Alevis, Kurds and leftists were killed.

In 1979, Left-wing journalist Abdi İpekçi was assassinated by Grey Wolves member Mehmet Ali Ağca. In 1981 Ağca attempted to assassinate Pope John Paul II.

United Kingdom 
In April 1999, David Copeland, a neo-Nazi, planted a series of nail bombs over 13 days. His attacks, which were aimed at London's black, Bangladeshi and gay communities, resulted in three dead and more than 100 injured. Copeland was a former member of two far-right political groups, the British National Party (BNP) and the National Socialist Movement. Copeland told police, "My aim was political. It was to cause a racial war in this country. There'd be a backlash from the ethnic minorities, then all the white people will go out and vote BNP."

In July 2007, Robert Cottage, a former BNP member, was convicted for possessing explosive chemicals in his home – described by police at the time of his arrest as the largest amount of chemical explosive of its type ever found in that country. In June 2008, Martyn Gilleard, a British Nazi sympathizer, was jailed after police found nail bombs, bullets, swords, axes and knives in his flat. Also in 2008, Nathan Worrell was found guilty of possession of material for terrorist purposes and racially aggravated harassment. The court heard that police found books and manuals containing recipes to make bombs and detonators using household items, such as weedkiller, at Worrell's flat. In July 2009, Neil Lewington was planning a terror campaign using weapons made from tennis balls and weedkiller against those he classified as non British.

In 2012, the British Home Affairs Committee warned of the threat of far-right terrorism in the UK, claiming it had heard persuasive evidence about the potential danger and cited the growth of similar threats across Europe.

Members of Combat 18 (C18), a neo-Nazi organisation based on the concept of "leaderless resistance", have been suspected in numerous deaths of immigrants, non-whites and other C18 members. Between 1998 and 2000, dozens of members were arrested. A group calling itself the Racial Volunteer Force split from C18 in 2002, retaining close links to its parent organization. Some journalists believed that the White Wolves were a C18 splinter group, alleging that the group had been set up by Del O'Connor, the former second-in-command of C18 and member of Skrewdriver Security. C18 attacks on immigrants continued through 2009. Weapons, ammunition and explosives were seized by police in the UK and almost every country in which C18 was active.

In 2016, Jo Cox, the Member of Parliament (MP) for the Batley and Spen constituency was murdered by Thomas Mair, who was motivated by neo-Nazi far-right political views and had connections to several far-right organisations in the UK, US, and South Africa such as National Vanguard and English Defence League (EDL).

On 16 December 2016, Home Secretary Amber Rudd designated the far-right, neo-Nazi group National Action (NA) as a terrorist organisation which criminalises membership or support for the organisation. On 12 June 2018, Jack Renshaw, 23, a former spokesperson for NA, admitted in a guilty plea to buying a 48 cm (19 in) replica Roman gladius (often wrongly referred to in the media as a machete) to murder Rosie Cooper, the Member of Parliament (MP) for the West Lancashire constituency.

In June 2017, Darren Osborne drove a van into a crowd leaving a mosque in Finsbury Park, north London, killing one and injuring nine others. Darren Osborne had acquired far-right publications from Tommy Robinson's English Defence League (EDL) and Jim Dowson and Jayda Fransen's Britain First Party (BF).

In March 2018, Mark Rowley, the outgoing head of UK counter-terror policing, revealed that four far-right terror plots had been foiled since the Westminster attack in March 2017.

In February 2019, an unnamed 33-year-old was arrested in West Yorkshire "as part of an investigation into suspected extreme right wing activity".

Northern Ireland 
Loyalist paramilitaries such as the Ulster Volunteer Force (UVF), Ulster Defence Association (UDA), Loyalist Volunteer Force (LVF) and Orange Volunteer Force (OVF) have been aligned with far-right politics and ideology and have been involved in numerous sectarian attacks and killings on Catholics both during and after the Troubles. During the conflict, British far-right activists supplied funds and weaponry to these groups in Northern Ireland. Following the Good Friday Agreement, some members of Loyalist groups orchestrated racist attacks in Northern Ireland, including pipe bomb and gun attacks on the homes of immigrants. As a result, Northern Ireland has a higher proportion of racist attacks than other parts of the UK, and was branded the "race-hate capital of Europe".

Vatican City 
On 13 May 1981, Pope John Paul II was shot and wounded by Mehmet Ali Ağca, a member of Grey Wolves, a Turkish ultranationalist organization.

Oceania

Australia 

In August 2016, Phillip Galea was charged with several terrorist offences. Galea had conducted "surveillance" of "left-wing premises" and planned to carry out bombings. Explosive ingredients were found at his home. Galea had links with organisations such as Combat 18 (C18) and the United Patriots Front (UPF). On 5 December 2019, a jury found Galea guilty of planning and preparing a terror attack.

In 2017 the Sydney Morning Herald reported on the conviction of neo-Nazi Michael James Holt, 26 who had threatened to carry out a mass shooting attack and considered Westfield Tuggerah as a target. He had manufactured home-made guns, knuckle dusters and slingshots in his grandfather's garage. Raids on his mother's home and a hotel room discovered more weapons including several firearms, slingshots and knuckle dusters.

New Zealand 

The Christchurch mosque shootings at Al Noor Mosque and Linwood Islamic Centre in Christchurch, New Zealand, which resulted in 51 deaths and injuries to 49 others, were committed by Australian Brenton Harrison Tarrant, who was motivated by white nationalism, neo-fascism (primarily ecofascism) and racism. Tarrant published a manifesto titled The Great Replacement, named after a French far-right white genocide conspiracy theory of the same name by writer Renaud Camus, and livestreamed the shootings on Facebook Live after announcing them on 8chan /pol/ (a centre of neo-Nazi/far-right discussion). The gunman also praised various other far-right mass murderers and killers such as Anders Behring Breivik (Utoya and Oslo attacks, Norway); Dylann Roof (Charleston church shooting, United States); Luca Traini (Macerata shooting, Italy); Anton Lundin Pettersson (Trollhattan school attack, Sweden); Darren Osborne (2017 Finsbury Park attack, United Kingdom); Alexandre Bissonnette (Quebec City mosque shooting, Canada/Quebec); and Josue Estèbanez (Murder of Carlos Palomino, Spain). He also referred to Breivik as "Knight Justiciar Breivik", and claimed to have briefly contacted him and his organisation, the Knights Templar, as well as etching the names of Pettersson, Traini and Bissonnette onto his guns which also contained references to various historical battles and figures, such as Charles Martel and the Battle of Tours, the Rotherham child sexual exploitation scandal, the neo-Nazi slogan Fourteen Words and "Kebab Remover". Additionally, he expressed support for British Union of Fascists (BUF) leader Oswald Mosley and wished to start a Second American Civil War to balkanize the United States over the Gun rights' issue and the Second Amendment. Prior to the terrorist attacks, the gunman had ties to Australia's prominent far-right organizations United Patriots Front (UPF), led by Blair Cottrell; and True Blue Crew (TBC), led by Kane Miller via interactions on Facebook and affectionately called Blair Cottrell "Emperor Blair" as well as an offer to join the Lads Society but declined and donated to Gènèration Identitaire (GI) and Identitäre Bewegung Österreich (IBÖ), the Austria and France branches of Generation Identity, an Identitarian organization, and exchanged emails with Martin Sellner of the latter group between January 2018 and July 2018. One email asked if they could meet up for coffee or beer in Vienna; another asked the former to send the latter a link to his English language YouTube channel. In August 2020, the gunman was sentenced to life in prison without parole for the attacks, the first such sentence in New Zealand history.

Asia

India 
In 1992, the 16th-century Babri Masjid in the city of Ayodhya, in Uttar Pradesh was demolished by the far-right Hindu nationalist Vishva Hindu Parishad. The demolition resulted in intercommunal rioting between India's Hindu and Muslim communities, causing the death of at least 2,000 people.

Israel
A number of right-wing Revisionist Zionist groups have been designated as terrorist organisations. Lehi, known as the Stern Gang, was a Zionist paramilitary and terrorist organization founded in Mandatory Palestine in 1940, professing National Bolshevism and influenced by Italian fascism. It carried out assassinations and alleged massacres until it was disbanded in 1949. The Jewish Underground was a radical right-wing organization considered terrorist by Israel. It plotted and carried out car and bus bombings, and attacks on students and on religious sites in the early 1980s until the arrest of its main activists in 1984. Kach and its splinter group Kahane Chai were a right-wing Orthodox Jewish, ultranationalist political party in Israel, formed in 1971 and designated as terrorist from the 1990s y Israel, Canada, the European Union, Japan, and the United States.

Syria & Lebanon
See Falangist militancy in Lebanon. and Fascist militancy in Syria and Lebanon.

See also

 Alt-right links to violence and terrorism
 Anti-communist mass killings
 Eco-terrorism
 Environmental terrorism
 Ethnic violence
 Far-left politics
 Far-right politics
 Left-wing terrorism 
 List of right-wing terrorist attacks
 Misogynist terrorism
 Narcoterrorism
 Nationalist terrorism
 Political violence
 Radical right (Europe)
 Radical right (United States)
 Religious terrorism
 Religious violence
 State terrorism
 Terrorgram
 Ultranationalism

References
Notes

Bibliography

 
 
  
 
 
 
 
 
 
 Michael, George. 2010. The Enemy of My Enemy: The Alarming Convergence of Militant Islam and the Extreme Right. University Press of Kansas. .  
 
 

Further reading
 Right-wing terrorism and violence in Western Europe: the RTV dataset. C-REX - Center for Research on Extremism.
 
 Florian Hartleb: Lone wolves. The New Terrorism of Right-Wing Single Actors, Heidelberg et al. 2020, Springer, .

 
1970s establishments in Europe
Terrorism
Anti-communist terrorism
Political violence
Terrorism
Hate crime